Carlos Jáuregui may refer to:
 Carlos Jáuregui (chess player) (1932–2013), Chilean–Canadian chess master
 Carlos Jáuregui (activist) (1957–1996), Argentinian LGBT-rights activist